Donna Elizabeth Deegan (born February 28, 1961) is an American author, breast cancer awareness advocate, and former weekday television anchor on First Coast News in Jacksonville, Florida. She is a Democratic candidate in the 2023 Jacksonville mayoral election. Deegan previously co-anchored the weeknight 5:30 and 11 p.m. newscasts of First Coast News.

Deegan was raised on the southside of Jacksonville and graduated from Bishop Kenny High School in 1979. She holds a BS '84 in Communications from Florida State University. She is the cousin of former Jacksonville mayor Tommy Hazouri.

Deegan started her career in 1984 as the morning anchor for WTXL-TV in Tallahassee. In 1985, she became the West Palm Bureau Chief for WTVX in Fort Pierce. She then became the morning and noon anchor for WPEC in West Palm Beach where she remained until August 1988. Deegan then took the opportunity to return to her native Jacksonville and became the anchor of the weekend broadcasts on WTLV. In 1993, she became anchor of the 5:30 and 11 p.m. newscasts on WTLV.

Breast cancer
Deegan is a three-time survivor of breast cancer. In 1999, she began her battle, with recurrences in 2002 and 2007. She is the founder of The Donna Foundation, which provides the necessary funds to care for local women living with breast cancer.

On September 19, 2007, Deegan stated that a CT scan showed a small "suspicious" lesion in her lower left lung. A PET scan confirmed the lesion was there, but nothing more was found anywhere in her body. Initially, doctors were uncertain if the lesion was indeed cancer. However, on September 21, 2007, after surgery to remove the lesion, it was confirmed that it was; Deegan yet again went under treatment for cancer, including chemotherapy.

26.2 with Donna
On June 22, 2006, the Mayo Clinic and The Donna Foundation announced the inaugural run of the 26.2 with Donna: The National Marathon to Fight Breast Cancer, benefiting Mayo Clinic and women living with breast cancer.

The inaugural run of the marathon took place on February 17, 2008, and was co-organised by Edith A. Perez. A health expo preceded the race. Deegan had been questioning whether she could run the whole marathon, but she and husband Tim finished in the middle. Over 7,000 runners showed up to run the race. Deegan announced that over $800,000 was raised to benefit the Mayo Clinic and women living with breast cancer. This money was used to help further a plan in which specialized treatment is used, instead of a "one size fits all" treatment.

The second run of the race took place on February 15, 2009. Deegan stated in a recent interview that she was hoping the race would be bigger and better than the inaugural, but cited tough economic times as the reason for the same turnout as the prior year's race. She announced a "memorial mile" for a portion of the race, in which people who have struggled with breast cancer will be remembered.

Congressional candidate
Donna Deegan declared her campaign for Florida's 4th congressional district in 2019. She ran as the Democratic challenger to Republican incumbent John Rutherford. Although she ultimately lost to Rutherford on November 3, 2020, she was able to earn a historic 38.9% of the vote. Healthcare, climate change, and gun violence prevention were all top priorities for Deegan on the campaign trail. Ultimately, Deegan underperformed now President Joe Biden in her own district losing by more than 22 points in a +17 district.

Awards and recognition
During her career, Deegan has received many awards including the Jacksonville Business Journal Women of Influence Award in 2004 and the Enterprising Women's Leadership Award in 2005. Deegan is also a published author. Her book, The Good Fight, chronicles her second bout with breast cancer and the on-line journal that she kept during that time.

On October 25, 2007, Deegan was honored by Community Connections of Jacksonville at the Omni Hotel. She is the 2007 recipient of the Florence N. Davis Award for Lifetime Achievement.

Personal life
Deegan is a member of St. Paul's Catholic Church in Jacksonville Beach. Her maiden name is Hazouri and her first marriage was to Kevin Clewis in Tallahassee in 1983 (later divorced). She has two children from her second marriage to Action News Jax Sports Director, Dan Hicken. She later married First Coast News Chief meteorologist Tim Deegan in 2002. She is from a Lebanese-Syrian family.

References

External links
 

 Breast Cancer Marathon
 The Donna Foundation

American television journalists
American women television journalists
Television anchors from Jacksonville, Florida
Living people
Florida State University alumni
Bishop Kenny High School alumni
Writers from Jacksonville, Florida
1961 births
American people of Lebanese descent
American people of Syrian descent
Candidates in the 2020 United States elections
Catholics from Florida
Florida Democrats
21st-century American women